Katie Mehnert (born December 27, 1975) is an American energy executive, entrepreneur, business author, activist, and speaker. She is the founder and chief executive officer of Ally Energy, an online workforce development platform and career website for the energy industry.

Career
Mehnert worked as a management consultant from 1997–2004 in the energy industry with Enron, Duke Energy, Waste Management, and Entergy. She left her position to join Shell as a global program & change leader in 2004, having stayed for 7 years working in health and safety. She then joined BP as the director of culture, safety and operational risk after the Deepwater Horizon spill.

In 2013, she got the idea of Pink Petro. She left BP to launch Pink Petro in 2014 to focus on improving the livelihoods of women professionals in the energy industry by creating an online learning community. She launched the community with initial support from Shell, Halliburton and KPMG. In 2016, she launched the HERWorld Energy forum (now called Energy 2.0) to foster connections between women in energy worldwide.

In 2020, Pink Petro rebranded as ALLY Energy.. In 2021, ALLY acquired Clean Energy Social, a jobs and networking community for the clean energy industry including solar, wind, power, oil and gas, power and utilities, biofuels, hydrogen, geothermal, carbon capture, and other sectors that make up the energy transition.

For her advocacy in gender and racial equality in the energy sector, Mehnert was named a Top 40 under 40 in the Houston Business Journal. She was named a Top Woman to Watch in Energy and a Top 50 Houston Woman. She's also received the Vanguard Award for developing a pool of talent in STEM careers from Girls Inc, and the recipient of the YWCA's Top Woman in Energy. Mehnert has also received the Women Who Mean Business award in energy, and was named a Global World Affairs Council Leader of Influence in 2021.

Education
Mehnert received a Bachelor of Arts degree from Louisiana State University in 1997 and later attended Jesse H. Jones Graduate School of Business in 2009 for executive education in energy. She is a graduate of the Center for Houston's Future.

US Department of Energy
In 2020, Mehnert was appointed by the Honorable James Campos under the Trump Administration to serve as an Ambassador to the United States Department of Energy in its Equity and Energy initiative. In 2022, Mehnert was appointed by Secretary Jennifer Granholm to the National Petroleum Council.

Hurricane Harvey
In August 2017, Mehnert lost her West Houston home and business due to the federally ordered reservoir releases made by the United States Army Corps of Engineers during Hurricane Harvey. While Harvey dumped a few feet of water into her home, the Mehnerts were able to stay on the second story. But a controlled release of nearby reservoirs washed through neighborhoods like hers in west Houston, submerging many homes above the first story. She and her daughter were rescued by volunteers on August 29.

Advocacy and activism
In 2019, Mehnert testified before US Congress on the Clean Energy Workforce of the Future. In 2021, Mehnert joined the cast of Hot Money, a documentary aimed at discussing the financial impact of climate change. The film was directed by Susan Kucera and produced by actor Jeff Bridges and Wesley Clark.

Books
 Grow with the Flow: Embrace Difference, Overcome Fear, and Progress with Purpose – ISBN 1634893239
 Everyday Superheroes: Women in Energy Careers – ISBN 1634894340

References

External links

1975 births
20th-century American businesspeople
20th-century American businesswomen
21st-century American businesspeople
21st-century American businesswomen
American energy industry executives
Businesspeople from Houston
Businesspeople from New Orleans
Jesse H. Jones Graduate School of Business alumni
Living people
Louisiana State University alumni
Rice University alumni